Phthalic acid is an aromatic dicarboxylic acid, with formula C6H4(CO2H)2. Although phthalic acid is of modest commercial importance, the closely related derivative phthalic anhydride is a commodity chemical produced on a large scale. Phthalic acid is one of three isomers of benzenedicarboxylic acid, the others being isophthalic acid and terephthalic acid.

Production
Phthalic acid is produced by the catalytic oxidation of naphthalene or ortho-xylene directly to phthalic anhydride and a subsequent hydrolysis of the anhydride.

Phthalic acid was first obtained by French chemist Auguste Laurent in 1836 by oxidizing naphthalene tetrachloride. Believing the resulting substance to be a naphthalene derivative, he named it "naphthalic acid". After the Swiss chemist Jean Charles Galissard de Marignac determined its correct formula, Laurent gave it its present name. Manufacturing methods in the nineteenth century included oxidation of naphthalene tetrachloride with nitric acid, or, better, oxidation of the hydrocarbon with fuming sulfuric acid, using mercury or mercury(II) sulfate as a catalyst.

Synthesis
Naphthalene on oxidation with potassium permanganate or potassium dichromate gives phthalic acid.

Reactions and uses

It is a dibasic acid, with pKas of 2.89 and 5.51. The monopotassium salt, potassium hydrogen phthalate is a standard acid in analytical chemistry. Typically phthalate esters are prepared from the widely available phthalic anhydride. Reduction of phthalic acid with sodium amalgam in the presence of water gives the 1,3-cyclohexadiene derivative.

Safety

Biodegradation
The bacteria Pseudomonas sp. P1 degrades phthalic acid.

See also
 Isophthalic acid
 Phthalate
 Phthalic anhydride
 Potassium hydrogen phthalate, a primary standard for acid–base titrations
 Terephthalic acid

References

 Merck Index, 9th ed, #7178

External links
International Chemical Safety Card 0768

Benzoic acids
Dicarboxylic acids